Luk Koon Pong (born 1 August 1978 in Hong Kong) is a former Hong Kong professional footballer.

Honours
Orient & Yee Hope Union
Hong Kong Senior Shield: 2000–01
South China
Hong Kong Senior Shield: 2001–02, 2002–03
Hong Kong League Cup: 2001–02
Kitchee
Hong Kong League Cup: 2006–07

External links
Luk Koon Pong at HKFA

Profile at kitchee.com 
Luk Koon Pong Fansite 

1978 births
Living people
Hong Kong footballers
Hong Kong international footballers
Association football defenders
Hong Kong Rangers FC players
Yee Hope players
South China AA players
Kitchee SC players
Hong Kong First Division League players
TSW Pegasus FC players
Happy Valley AA players
Hong Kong League XI representative players